Dwayne Barker (born 21 September 1983) is an English former professional rugby league footballer.

Barker has previously played for the Leeds Rhinos, Hull Kingston Rovers, and the Castleford Tigers (Heritage № 867). He has also enjoyed short loan spells with the London Broncos and Hull FC.

Background
Barker was born in Leeds, West Yorkshire, England.

Early career

He captained the Rhinos Academy to Grand Final success in 2001 beating Wigan. He originally signed for the club from local amateur team Milford ARLFC in 1999. He is blessed with good ball skills and pace.

Controversy
Dwayne Barker was ordered to do 150 hours of community service following an incident outside a Leeds nightclub in July 2002.

Chev Walker and Ryan Bailey were sent to young offenders institutions for their involvement in a city centre brawl. Walker was sentenced to 18 months whilst his then Leeds teammate Bailey was given nine months' detention after an incident outside a Leeds nightclub in July 2002. Rochdale Hornets player Paul Owen was gaoled for 15 months.

All four pleaded guilty to violent disorder at a previous hearing.

The court heard how the brawl began after Owen was said to have been tricked into handing over his mobile phone to an unidentified woman outside Creation nightclub. As he tried to recover it, the Leeds players thought she was being assaulted and set about Owen.

A four-minute video of the brawl was played which showed the Leeds players trading kicks and blows with Owen. At one point Owen was seen to punch Barker to the ground and as he struggled to regain his feet he was kicked in the head and knocked out.

The judge said Barker had played a limited role in the violence.

Harlquins RL

Dwayne Barker signed a 12-month contract with Harlequins RL for 2008's Super League XIII season.

References

External links
Quins profile
(archived by web.archive.org) Official Player Profile
BBC Sport player profile
(archived by web.archive.org) SL Stats
Hull Sign Leeds Pair
Dwayne Barker Yearly Statistics
(archived by web.archive.org) Stats → PastPlayers → B at hullfc.com
(archived by web.archive.org) Statistics at hullfc.com

1983 births
Living people
Castleford Tigers players
Dewsbury Rams players
English rugby league players
Featherstone Rovers players
Halifax R.L.F.C. players
Hull F.C. players
Hull Kingston Rovers players
Hunslet R.L.F.C. players
Leeds Rhinos players
London Broncos players
Rugby league centres
Rugby league locks
Rugby league players from Leeds
Rugby league second-rows